William Leroy Lohrman (May 22, 1913 – September 13, 1999) was a pitcher in Major League Baseball. He pitched in 198 games from 1934 to 1944.  Bill played for the Giants, Dodgers, Cardinals, Phillies, and Reds.  Bill was born and raised Brooklyn and went to live in New Paltz, New York following his baseball career.

Following the 1941 season, Lohrman, along with Ken O'Dea, Johnny McCarthy and $50,000, were traded to the St. Louis Cardinals for Johnny Mize.

References

External links

Major League Baseball pitchers
Brooklyn Dodgers players
Cincinnati Reds players
St. Louis Cardinals players
New York Giants (NL) players
Philadelphia Phillies players
1913 births
1999 deaths
Baseball players from New York (state)
Springfield Senators players
Keokuk Indians players
Baltimore Orioles (IL) players
Hartford Senators players
Jersey City Giants players